A pensioner is a person who receives a pension, most commonly because of retirement from the workforce. This is a term typically used in the United Kingdom (along with OAP, initialism of old-age pensioner), Ireland and Australia where someone of pensionable age may also be referred to as an 'old age pensioner'. In the United States, the term retiree is more common, and in New Zealand, the term superannuitant is commonly used. In many countries, increasing life expectancy has led to an expansion of the numbers of pensioners, and they are a growing political force.

Political parties

 50Plus in the Netherlands
 Dor, the Israeli Pensioners' Party
 National Party of Retirees and Pensioners in Poland
 Party of United Pensioners of Serbia
 Pensioners' Party
 Norwegian Pensioners Party
 Scottish Senior Citizens Unity Party
 Swedish Senior Citizen Interest Party

Other uses
 In the University of Cambridge, a pensioner is a student who is not a scholar or sizar and who pays for his or her tuition and commons. The term commoner may also be applied, especially at the University of Oxford.
 A political pensioner is a member of a formerly ruling dynasty who is paid a 'pension' (e.g. by the British raj) as a partial compensation for the income lost by not exercising an ancestral claim to a native throne.
 A Chelsea Pensioner is a retired British soldier who lives within the Royal Hospital.
 In the Thoroughbred breeding industry, a pensioner is a stallion that has been retired from stud duty due to declining fertility (usually related to age).

See also
 AARP (American Association of Retired Persons)
 Age UK
 Elderly care
 ProtectSeniors.Org
 Reminiscence therapy
 Senior citizen
 Silver surfer (internet user)

References

External links
 University of Cambridge Jargon
 Pension Watch Pension watch is a comprehensive online resource on non-contributory (social) pensions.

Pensions